Nikola Kljusev (2 October 1927 – 16 January 2008) was a Macedonian academician and politician. Kljusev served as the first Prime Minister of the Republic of Macedonia (now North Macedonia) from January 27, 1991, until August 17, 1992, following the country's independence from Yugoslavia in 1991.

Early life
Nikola Kljusev was born in Štip, Kingdom of Yugoslavia, on October 2, 1927. He graduated from the University of Belgrade Faculty of Economics in 1953, before obtaining his doctorate in economics at the same university in 1964. Kljusev's doctoral thesis was "Criteria and Methods for Assessment of Economic Effectiveness of Investments".

Economics
Kljusev began his career in economic academia as an assistant at the Institute for Industrial Scientific Research. He later served as a researcher and director of the Economics Institute in Skopje. Kljusev also served as a professor and dean of the Skopje Faculty of Economics. Kljusev was elected to the Macedonian Academy of Arts and Sciences (MANU) in 1988 and remained at the organization until his death in 2008.

Politics
Nikola Kljusev served as the first Prime Minister of Macedonia for 19 months in 1991 and 1992 after the split of the Federation. Kljusev is credited with ushering Macedonia through a largely peaceful transition to full independence. Macedonia's independence was in sharp contrast to the violent wars that engulfed other nations of the former Federation such as Croatia and Bosnia-Herzegovina, during the 1990s.

Under Kljusev's leadership (and background in economics), the denar was introduced as Macedonia's new national currency. He also headed the difficult negotiations to withdraw the Yugoslav Army (Federal Republic of Yugoslavia) from Macedonia as Prime Minister.

Kljusev was a non-partisan prime minister, and, thus, was not a member of any political party while in office. He later joined  VMRO-DPMNE, a major Macedonian political party, after leaving office. He was elected President of the Council of the VMRO-DPMNE in 1997.

Nikola Kljusev returned to public office later as the Defence Minister, from 1998 until 2000.

Death
Nikola Kljusev died in Macedonia on January 16, 2008. His death was announced by the Macedonian Academy of Science and Arts (MANU).

Kljusev was buried in the Alley of the Great at the Butel cemetery in Skopje, Macedonia following a funeral officiated by the head of the  Macedonian Christian Church, Archbishop Stephen of Ohrid. The government of Macedonia declared January 18, 2008, as a national day of mourning.

References

1927 births
2008 deaths
People from Štip
Defence ministers of North Macedonia
Prime Ministers of North Macedonia
Eastern Orthodox Christians from North Macedonia
Members of the Macedonian Orthodox Church
Macedonian economists
University of Belgrade Faculty of Economics alumni
VMRO-DPMNE politicians